Phetchaburi or Phet Buri is a town (thesaban mueang) in southern Thailand, capital of Phetchaburi Province. In Thai, Phetchaburi means "city of diamonds" (buri meaning "city" in Sanskrit). It is approximately 160 km south of Bangkok, at the northern end of the Thai peninsula. As of 2005, the town had a population of 26,181 and covers the two tambon Tha Rap and Khlong Krachaeng.

The Phetchaburi River runs through the middle of the city. The region is mostly flat, save for a single hill (called Khao Wang) on the outskirts of town. The royal palace named Phra Nakhon Khiri and one of the many wats are on top of Khao Wang. The hill and town is the site of an annual festival, called the Phra Nakhon Khiri Fair. It lasts for eight days in early February and includes a sound and light show and classical Thai dance.

The official city flower is the leelowadee flower or frangipani.

Phetchaburi is known for its traditional Thai desserts. The most well known is a custard dessert called khanom mor gaeng. Other popular desserts include Portuguese-influenced thong yip, thong yod, and foi thong.

Climate

Education 
Phetchaburi has numerous private and public schools from K-12. Several have English programs taught by native English speakers to ready students for higher education. Some of the schools are Benchamatheputhit School, Prommanusorn School, Benjamaputit Mattayom School, Wat Don Kaitia Prathom School, and Arunpradit Prathom/Mattayom School. There are also several universities, including Phetchaburi Ratchabat University.

Transportation 

In the city proper, the primary mode of transportation is by motor vehicle with motorbikes being the most popular. Cars are the second major form of transportation. Locals also travel by hired motorcycles and songthaews.

References

External links

Kaeng Krachan National Park, Phetchaburi

Populated places in Phetchaburi province
Cities and towns in Thailand